Spin the Bottle is a 1998 American film directed by Jamie Yerkes.

Premise 
Childhood friends meet up for a reunion.

Cast 
 Heather Goldenhersh as Rachel
 Jessica Faller as Alex
 Mitchell Riggs as Ted
 Kim Winter as Bev
 Holter Graham as Jonah

References

External links 
 TLA Releasing - Spin the Bottle
 

1998 films
1998 comedy-drama films
American comedy-drama films
1990s English-language films
1990s American films